The Western Clydesdales are a rugby league football club based in Toowoomba, Queensland, Australia. The Clydesdales originally played in the Queensland Cup from the competition's inception in 1996 until 2006, and were the feeder club for the Brisbane Broncos between 1999 and 2006. They will re-enter the Queensland Cup in 2023 as the Western Clydesdales.

History

"Galloping Clydesdales" 
Historically, the Clydesdales were the representative team for the Toowoomba competition. They competed in the Bulimba Cup between 1925 and 1972, winning on sixteen occasions. In 1924, the team defeated England, New Zealand, Brisbane, Ipswich, the New South Wales state side and New South Wales Rugby Football League premiership holders, South Sydney.   The win against the English touring side was noteworthy as it was the first time England had ever lost to a provincial side. The team, with a large number of incumbent Australian and Queensland players, was coined the "Galloping Clydesdales".

Players to represent Australia while playing for the Clydesdales include Herb Steinohrt, Duncan Thompson, Tom Gorman, Mick Masden, Dan Dempsey and Duncan Hall.

Winfield State League (1982-1995) 
In 1982, the Clydesdales joined the Winfield State League. They were eliminated in the semi-final stage in the 1987, 1988, 1989, 1992, 1993 and 1995 seasons. During the 1992 season, Toowoomba was re-named the South-West Division.

Queensland Cup (1996-2006) 
Toowoomba played in the inaugural season of the Queensland Cup in 1996, finishing as minor premiers. They claimed their first premiership with a 8-6 win against the Redcliffe Dolphins at Lang Park. The next two seasons were not as successful, with Toowoomba dropping to 15th place in the 1998 Queensland Cup regular season.

The Clydesdales formed a feeder club arrangement with the Brisbane Broncos ahead of the 1999 Queensland Cup season, which saw fringe and up-and-coming players from the NRL club turn out for Toowoomba in the Queensland Cup. The Clydesdales were the competition's big improvers as they finished in fourth place and were ultimately eliminated by the defending premiers, Norths Devils.

The following season, 2000, resulted in Toowoomba finishing third and qualifying for their second Queensland Cup grand final, beating Redcliffe 46-12 in the major semi-final. The Dolphins would gain their revenge in the grand final, defeating the Clydesdales 14-6.

2001 saw the Queensland Cup return to Toowoomba, as the Clydesdales finished minor premiers with just one loss and one draw all season. In a reverse of the previous year's finals, the Redcliffe Dolphins defeated Toowoomba in the major semi-final to advance directly to the grand final. Toowoomba were able to overcome the Burleigh Bears in the preliminary final, before facing Redcliffe in a rematch of the previous year's grand final. Halfback Casey McGuire scored the winning try inside the last minute of the game, giving the Clydesdales a famous 28-26 victory.

Toowoomba would miss the finals during the next two seasons, before returning to the finals in 2004 and 2005, but were eliminated by the Wynnum-Manly Seagulls and Redcliffe Dolphins respectively, each game in extra time.

The Clydesdales would return to the minor premiership of the Queensland Cup in 2006. They would once again ultimately face the Redcliffe Dolphins in the grand final. After scoring the first try of the game, the Clydesdales would eventually lose 6-27.

The Broncos wound up the feeder club arrangement with the Clydesdales in December 2006, resulting in Toowoomba withdrawing from the Queensland Cup. With the creation of the Townsville Blackhawks in 2015, Toowoomba would be the largest regional centre without a Queensland Cup side

Return to Queensland Cup (2023-     ) 
In July 2022, the Queensland Rugby League announced the Clydesdales would return to the Queensland Cup for the 2023 season. The bid to return a Toowoomba team to the Queensland Cup initially planned to call the team the Western Mustangs after the existing junior representative team. But in August 2021 it was announced the team, if readmitted, would be named the Western Clydesdales in order to represent both the western Queensland and Toowoomba elements of the club.  The Clydesdales announced a partnership with the Canterbury-Bankstown Bulldogs, whereby the NRL club would establish an academy servicing Toowoomba and south-west Queensland and integrate with Clydesdales coaching staff on and off the field.

Former Bulldogs NRL player Jason Alchin was named as the head coach of the Western Clydesdales for the 2023 season.

Notable players
Many Australian and Queensland representatives have played for Toowoomba during their career.
Berrick Barnes
Laurie Blake
Michael Hancock
Ben Ikin
Mick Madsen
Paul Morgan
Herb Steinohrt
David Taylor
Sam Thaiday
Duncan Thompson
Adrian Vowles
Carl Webb
Paul Green (rugby league)
Justin Hodges
Michael Ryan (rugby league)
Dane Carlaw
Kyle Warren
Edwin Brown
Nathan Friend
Dan Stains
Lote Tuqiri
Luke Priddis
Brad Meyers
Don Saunders
Neale Wyatt

See also

References

External links
 Clydesdales homepage
 Toowoomba's Homepage
 Dire financial status forces Clydesdales to quit Qld Cup

1919 establishments in Australia
Rugby league teams in Queensland
Rugby clubs established in 1919
Toowoomba Clydesdales